The Ekström Ice Shelf is the ice shelf lying between Sorasen Ridge and Halvfarryggen Ridge, on the Princess Martha Coast of Queen Maud Land. It was first mapped by the Norwegian–British–Swedish Antarctic Expedition (NBSAE) (1949–1952), and named for Bertil Ekström, a Swedish mechanical engineer with the NBSAE, who drowned when the weasel (track-driven vehicle) he was driving plunged over the edge of Quar Ice Shelf on February 24, 1951.

Germany's Neumayer-Station III is to the northeast at Atka Bay.

References 

Ice shelves of Queen Maud Land
Princess Martha Coast